Below is the order of battle for the Battle of Beiping-Tianjin, called the Peiking-Tientsin Operation in pinyin spelling, a series of battles fought from 25 July through 31 July 1937 as part of the Second Sino-Japanese War. It was called the North China Incident (北支事変, Hokushi jihen) by the Japanese.

Empire of Japan

Ground 
Japanese China Garrison Army 
 Lieut. General Kanichiro Tashiro (1 May 1936 – 12 July 1937)
 Lieut. General Kiyoshi Katsuki (12 July 1937 – 26 August 1937)
 China Garrison Infantry "Kawabe" Brigade
 Major General Masakazu Kawabe
 1st China Garrison Infantry Regiment
 2nd China Garrison Infantry Regiment
 China Garrison Cavalry Unit
 China Garrison Artillery Regiment
 China Garrison Engineer Unit
 China Garrison Armored Unit (17 tanks?)
 China Garrison Signal Unit
 China Garrison Army Hospital

 5th Division
 General Seishirō Itagaki
 9th Infantry Brigade
 11th Infantry Regiment
 41st Infantry Regiment
 21st Infantry Brigade
 21st Infantry Regiment
 42nd Infantry Regiment
 5th Mountain Artillery Regiment
 5th Cavalry Regiment
 5th Engineer Regiment
 5th Transport Regiment
 20th Division
 Lieutenant General Bunsaburo Kawakishi
 39th Infantry Brigade
 77th Infantry Regiment
 78th Infantry Regiment
 40th Infantry Brigade
 79th Infantry Regiment
 80th Infantry Regiment
 26th Field Artillery Regiment
 28th Cavalry Regiment
 20th Engineer Regiment
 20th Transport Regiment

 1st Independent Mixed "Sakai" Brigade
 Lieutenant General Sakai Koji
 4th Tank Battalion
 12 Type 89 Medium Tanks
 13 Type 95 Light Tanks
 12 Type 94 tankettes
 4 Armored Engineer Vehicles
 1st Independent Infantry Regiment
 1st Independent Artillery Battalion
 1st Independent Engineer Company
 11th Independent Mixed "Suzuki" Brigade
 Lieutenant General Shigiyasu Suzuki
 11th Independent Infantry Regiment
 12th Independent Infantry Regiment
 11th Independent Cavalry Company
 11th Independent Field Artillery Regiment
 12th Independent Mountain Gun Regiment
 11th Independent Engineer Company
 11th Independent Transport Company
East Hopei Army 
 1st Corps (Tungchow)  4,000 men
 2nd Corps (Tsunhua)   4,000 men
 3rd Corps (Tungchow)  4,000 men
 4th Corps (Tsunhua)   4,000 men
 Training Corps (Tungchow) 2,000 men

Air 
 Temporary China Area Aviation Division (Chugoku-Homen Rinji Hikoshidan)
 General Yoshitoshi Tokugawa
 1st Army Air Battalion (reconnaissance) Ki-3, Ki-4
 2nd Army Air Battalion (fighter aircraft) Ki-10
 3rd Army Air Battalion (long range reconnaissance)
 5th Army Air Battalion (light bomber) Ki-2
 6th Army Air Battalion (heavy bomber) Ki-2
 8th Army Air Battalion (fighter) Ki-10
 9th Army Air Battalion (heavy bomber) Ki-1
 3rd Independent Air Company (heavy bomber)Ki-1
 4th independent squadron (reconnaissance)
 6th independent squadron (reconnaissance)
 9th independent squadron (fighter) Ki-10
 1st, 2nd Airfield companies
 8th, 9th Signal platoons
 1st Truck Transport company
 3rd Field aircraft depot

Naval 
 2nd Fleet
 Admiral Zengo Yoshida

Republic of China 
 29th Army 
 Commander: Sung Che-yuan
 Deputy: Tung Lin-keh

 37th Division (15,750 men)
 Lt. Gen. Feng Chih-an
 Special Operations Regiment 
 109th Brigade
 110th Brigade
 111th Brigade
 Independent 35th Brigade
 38th Division (15,400 men)
 General Chang Tse-chung
 Special Operations Regiment
 112th Brigade
 113th Brigade
 114th Brigade
 Independent 26th Brigade
 132nd Division (15,000 men)
 General Chao Teng-yu
 Special Operations Regiment
 1st Brigade
 2nd Brigade
 Independent 27th Brigade
 Independent 28th Brigade

 143rd Division (in Chahar) (15,100 men)
 General Liu Ju-ming
 Special Operations Regiment
 1st Brigade
 2nd Brigade
 Independent 29th Brigade
 Independent 31st Brigade
 Security Brigade
 9th Cavalry Division (3,000 men)
 1st Brigade
 2nd Brigade
 Independent 13th Cavalry Brigade (1,500 men)
 Hopei Peace Preservation Force (Peiwan, 2,500 men)
 Independent 39th Brigade (3,500 men)
 Independent 40th Brigade (3,400 men)

 53rd Army
 General Wan Fulin

Notes

Sources

Print

Web 
 
 
 
 
 

Beiping–Tianjin
Beiping–Tianjin